Mactan–Cebu International Airport is an international airport serving Metro Cebu and serves as the main gateway to the Central Visayas region. Located on a  site in Lapu-Lapu City on Mactan, it is the second busiest airport in the Philippines. The airport serves as a hub for Cebu Pacific, Pan Pacific Airlines, Philippine Airlines and Royal Air Philippines, and as a base for Philippines AirAsia.

The airport is managed by the Mactan–Cebu International Airport Authority and operated by the GMR–Megawide Cebu Airport Corporation.

History

Early years
The runway was built by the United States Air Force in 1956 as an emergency airport for Strategic Air Command bombers and it was known as the Mactan Air Base. It remained a spartan outpost until the Vietnam War in the 1960s when it became a base for a C-130 unit of the U.S. Air Force.

Commercial operations started on April 27, 1966 for domestic flights. It replaced the now closed Lahug Airport (now the site of Cebu IT Park) which could no longer be expanded due to safety and physical problems. International charter flights later commenced in 1978.

On July 31, 1990, Republic Act No. 6958 was approved, which creates and establishes the Mactan–Cebu International Airport Authority (MCIAA). The law transferred the existing assets and operations of Mactan–Cebu International Airport and Lahug Airport to the newly-created MCIAA.

Expansion
Plans for a new terminal were laid as early as 2005, but the expansion of the existing terminal was instead pursued. By 2009, the airport handled 4.8 million passengers, way beyond the capacity of 4.5 million. By 2017, the airport handled more than ten million passengers.

The expansion of the airport was included on the list of big-ticket public-private partnership (PPP) projects as part of the PPP infrastructure program that was launched in 2010. Bidding was opened in 2012. On April 23, 2014, the Department of Transportation and Communications awarded the operations and maintenance of MCIA to a consortium of the Philippine Megawide Construction Corporation and Bangalore-based GMR Infrastructure. MCIAA handed over the operations and maintenance of the airport to the private consortium on November 1, 2014.

On June 29, 2015, President Benigno Aquino III led the ground-breaking rites at the site of the old Philippine Air Force base in Lapu-Lapu City which had been demolished to give way for the Terminal 2 construction. Construction of Terminal 2 began on January 22, 2016. On June 7, 2018, Terminal 2 was inaugurated by President Rodrigo Duterte, with the terminal being operational on July 1.

On May 5, 2021, the second taxiway and expanded apron of the airport was inaugurated.

Contemporary history
Following Typhoon Haiyan (Yolanda), one of the biggest typhoons ever recorded and one of the most destructive typhoons in the Philippines, the airport was used as a center for air operations for the relief effort.  The airport is centrally located in the Visayas which was the region most affected by the storm, especially the Eastern Visayas islands of Leyte and Samar.  The Cebu airport was relatively unaffected by the storm while the airports of  the Eastern Visayas were unusable immediately after.

On November 12, 2013, the world's longest and heaviest aircraft, the Antonov An-225 Mriya, landed at MCIA from the Zagreb International Airport in Croatia for the first time in the Philippines to deliver a 180-ton replacement transformer from the Croatian energy company KONČAR to the First Gen Corporation's power plant in Batangas City. Officials of First Gen approached MCIAA General Manager Nigel Paul Villarete to allow the Antonov An-225 to utilize the airport for the transportation of their delivery after officials from Clark International Airport, Ninoy Aquino International Airport in Manila, and Subic Bay International Airport refused to allow the aircraft to utilize their airports. According to First Gen President Francis Giles Puno, MCIA had been inspected by Antonov Airlines, the owner of the Antonov An-225 aircraft, as the most viable option for their aircraft, "after considering the combination of airport, onward land transport and sea freight."

On August 27, 2018, on the occasion of National Heroes Day, President Duterte expressed support for renaming the airport after Mactan chieftain Lapu-Lapu whose forces killed Ferdinand Magellan during the Battle of Mactan in 1521.

On December 16, 2021, the airport was closed indefinitely after sustaining heavy damage from Typhoon Rai (Odette) before resuming operations on December 19 under a new layout that integrates both terminals together since the domestic terminal sustained the most damage, while the international terminal only suffered minor damage.

In September 2022, Aboitiz purchased a 33.33% stake on GMR–Megawide Cebu Airport Corporation. Aboitiz plans to completely take full control of the operations of the airport by 2024.

Future development
On May 22, 2017, Mactan–Cebu International Airport Authority (MCIAA) passed a resolution approving the proposal to start the construction of a second runway, which was proposed by Rep. Raul del Mar of Cebu. Del Mar proposed that the construction of the second runway be funded using P4.9- billion sourced from the P14.4 billion premium given by the GMCAC when it won the bid to develop and manage the MCIA terminal. Once completed, the second runway will be adjacent to the existing first runway and will enable simultaneous runway operations.

The groundbreaking ceremony of the second runway was held on January 14, 2020.

Terminals

Terminal 1 

Terminal 1, which was built in 1990, serves as the airport's domestic terminal. Prior to the completion and opening of Terminal 2, it housed both domestic and international operations and has an annual capacity of 4.5 million passengers.

It has six jet bridges and also has remote parking spaces for aircraft. There are five baggage conveyor belts in the baggage claim area.

From 2018 to 2019, Terminal 1 was renovated. The renovation includes the expansion of the pre-departure area and improved flight information displays. An airport village was constructed as part of the project and is connected to the pre-departure area.

Terminal 2 

Terminal 2, which started construction in 2016 and opened for operations on July 1, 2018, is the newest airport terminal and has an annual capacity of eight million passengers, increasing the airport's capacity to 12.5 million passengers per year.

Integrated Design Associates designed the terminal with European timber arches from Austria that look like an inverted boat hull, and a wave-like roof that evokes a tropical and resort-like feel. It represents the sea waves that surrounds the island of Cebu. Terminal 2 won an award for the category "Completed Buildings – Transport" at the World Architecture Festival in 2019.

Structure

Runways
The airport has a single  runway with a width of  that was built by the United States in 1956 as an emergency airport for U.S. Air Forces' Strategic Air Command bombers and was known as Mactan Air Base.  The runway is complemented by a full-length taxiway that it shares with the current Mactan Air Base of the Philippine Air Force.

Second runway
A second runway is being constructed since January 2020. The runway is estimated to be completed in December and will fully operate in 2023. The runway will be used for landings and takeoff's and it can also serve as an emergency runway in case of major situations in the main runway.

Other structures
The airport has other government buildings like the two-level CAAP Administration Building and the six-level MCIAA Corporate Building, both located within the airport complex. The parking area outside the terminals has a total capacity of 750 cars.

Airlines and destinations 
The airport hosts 34 domestic destinations and 11 international routes.

Passenger 

Notes

Cargo

Statistics 

Data from the Mactan–Cebu International Airport Authority (MCIAA).

Accidents and incidents 

 On September 26, 2016, Cebgo Flight 6577, an ATR 72-500 bound for Tacloban, was taking off from runway 22 when the crew observed fluctuations on oil indications for the left-hand engine and decided to reject the takeoff. A fire was discovered on both left hand main wheels while taxiing, leading the crew to stop on the taxiway and begin an evacuation of the aircraft. One passenger received minor injuries during the evacuation.
 On November 1, 2018, Cebgo Flight 6717, an ATR 72-600 bound for Cagayan de Oro experienced engine fire on takeoff. The engine was shut down and a fire drill was performed. The aircraft safely landed back at the airport. No injuries were reported.
 On December 10, 2021, Philippine Airlines Flight 2369, a De Havilland Canada Dash 8-Q400 originating from Caticlan, skidded off the runway shortly after landing in rainy weather. No injuries were reported.
 On October 23, 2022, Korean Air Flight 631, an Airbus A330-300 with registration HL7525 originating from Seoul, overshot the runway after two landing attempts, shortly after landing in stormy weather. No injuries were reported, but the airplane was damaged beyond repair.
 On December 7, 2022, Philippine Airlines Flight 1862, an Airbus A321-200 bound for Manila, caught fire on the tailpipe of one of the engines during engine start and was caused to an excess of fuel in the combustion chamber, the turbine, or the exhaust nozzle that ignites. No injuries were reported among the 64 passengers.

References

External links

 Mactan–Cebu International Airport
 Mactan–Cebu International Airport Authority
 Mactan Cebu International Airport – flight status and updates for travellers to and from Cebu
 
 
 

Airports in the Philippines
Transportation in Cebu
Buildings and structures in Lapu-Lapu City
Airports established in 1966
1966 establishments in the Philippines